The Ligures (singular Ligus or Ligur; English: Ligurians; Greek:  - Lígues) were an ancient Indo-European people who appear to have originated in, and gave their name to, Liguria, a region of north-western Italy. Elements of the Ligures appear to have migrated to other areas of western Europe, including the Iberian peninsula.
They had a tribal organization with numerous tribes that are listed below:

Ancestors

Proto-Indo-Europeans (Proto-Indo-European speakers)
Proto-Ligurians (Proto-Ligurian speakers)

Ligures

Alpini (or Montani) (in the hinterland of Savona)
Apuani (in Lunigiana)
Bagienni (or Vagienni) (in the area of Bene Vagienna)
Beretini
Bimbelli
Briniates (or Boactes) (in the area of Brugnato)
Casuentillani
Cavaturini
Celelates / Celeiates
Cerdiciates
Deciates (in modern Provence, west of the river Var)
Dectumini
Docilii
Ectini
Eguituri
Epanterii
Euburiates
Friniates (in the area now called Frignano)
Garuli
Genuates (or Genuenses) (in and around Genoa)
Hercates
Iemeri
Ingauni
Intemelii
Ilvates-Iriates
Ilvates / Mainland Ilvates / Iriates / (Iluates?) (in the territory of Tortona, Voghera and Libarna)
Ilvates / Island Ilvates (or Iluates) (if different from the Iriates) (on the island of Ilva, today's Elba)
Laevi (along the Ticino River and in the area of Pavia)
Lapicini (or Lapicinii)
Libici (or Libui) / Libarnesi
Magelli (or Mucelli) (in the Mugello region)
Marici (near the confluence of the rivers Orba, Bormida and Tanaro)
Nematuri
Nerusi
Odiates
Oratelli
Olivari
Oxybii (or Oxibii) (in modern Provence)
Sabates (in the area of Vado Ligure)
Segusini - in Susa
Soti
Statielli (or Statiellates) (in the valleys of the Orba [left bank], Bormida and Tanaro)
Sueltri (or Suelteri)
Tigulli (or Tigullii) (with main town at Tigullia, now in the frazione of Trigoso)
Triullati
Turi
Vediantii
Veiturii (west of the Genuates, in and around Voltri [now a suburb of Genoa])
Langates (or Langenses) (north of the Genuates)
Mentovini
Sestrini
Utrini
Veleiates (or Veliates) (between Veleia and Libarna)
Vellauni
Veneni
Venisani
Vesubiani – Vésubie, Southern Gaul
Vibelli

Ligures mixed with other peoples

Celto-Ligurians / Gallo-Ligurians
May have been Celtic tribes influenced by Ligurians, heavyly Celticized Ligurian tribes that shifted to a Celtic ethnolinguistic identity or mixed Celtic-Ligurian tribes. They dwelt in southeastern Transalpine Gaul and northwestern Cisalpine Gaul, mainly in the Western Alps regions, Rhodanus eastern basin and upper Po river basin.
Acitavones
Adenates / Adanates – slopes of the Western Alps (Maurienne-Modanne), Southern Gaul
Adunicates – Andon área, Southern Gaul
Albici – Middle and Lower Durance river valley, Southern Gaul (tribal confederation)
Albienses / Albici Proper
Vordenses
Vulgientes
Anatili
Avantices (Avantici)
Avatices / Avatici – Camargue – Rhodanus river delta, south of the Volcae Arecomici, in Southern Gaul
Belaci
Bodiontici – in Southern Gaul
Bormanni
Bramovices – Low Tarentaise, Savoy, Southern Gaul
Briganii / Brigianii – Briançon, High Durance river valley, Southern Gaul
Caburri
Camatulici
Casmonates / Cosmonates (in the area of Castellazzo Bormida)
Caturiges – Chorges, High Durance river valley, in Southern Gaul
Cavares/Cavari – North of Low Durance, Arausio (Orange), in Southern Gaul (tribal confederation)
Cavares Proper
Meminii / Menimii
Ceutrones / Centrones – Moûtiers, in the western Alps slopes, Southern Gaul
Coenicenses
Dexivates
Esubiani – Ubaye Valley, Southern Gaul
Euburiates
Gabieni
Glanici
Graioceli / Garocelli – Alps western slopes in part of eastern Savoy, and Alps eastern slopes, northwestern Piedmont in the Graian Alps
Iadatini
Iconii – Gap, in Southern Gaul
Irienses
Libii / Libici
Ligauni
Maielli
Medulli – upper valley of Maurienne, Southern Gaul
Naburni
Nearchi
Nemalones / Nemolani – in Southern Gaul
Nemeturii – High Var river valley, Southern Gaul
Orobii - in the northern Italian Alpine valleys of Bergamo, Como and Lecco
Quariates – in Southern Gaul
Reieni / Reii - in Southern Gaul
Salassi (Gallo-Ligurian people) – Aosta Valley and Canavese (Northern Piedmont) (Ivrea)
Salyes / Salluvii - in southeastern Cisalpine Gaul (modern Provence)
Savincates
Sebagini
Segobriges
Segovi
Segusini - in Segusa (today's Susa, Piemonte)
Sentienes / Sentii – Senez, in Southern Gaul
Sigorii
Sogiontii
Suelteri / Sueltri
Suetrii
Taurini (or Taurisci) (Gallo-Ligurian people) – parts of central Piedmont (Turin region)
Tebavii
Tricastini
Tricorii – in Southern Gaul
Tritolii
Ucenni
Veamini – in Southern Gaul
Vennavi
Vergunni – Vinon-sur-Verdon, Southern Gaul
Verucini
Vocontii   / Transalpine Gaul Vertamocori – Vaison-la-Romaine, Southern Gaul (in modern Provence, on the east bank of the Rhône and Vercors, southern Gaul.
Vertamocorii – Eastern Piedmont (Novara). Said by Pliny to descend from the Vocontii.

Ibero-Ligurians
Elisyces / Helisyces – a tribe that dwelt in the region of Narbo (Narbonne) and modern northern Roussillon. May have been either Iberian or Ligurian or a Ligurian-Iberian tribe.

Possible Ligurian tribes

In the islands of Corsica and far northern Sardinia dwelt a group of tribes called Corsi (Ancient Corsicans or Paleo-Corsicans) that may have been related to the Ligures or part of them. The Rutuli were a people that some modern scholars think were related to the Ligurians

The Corsi were an ancient people of Sardinia and Corsica, to which they gave the name. They dwelt at the extreme north-east of Sardinia, in the region today known as Gallura.

Corsi
Belatones (Belatoni)
Cervini
Cilebenses (Cilibensi)
Corsi Proper, they dwelt at the far north-east of Sardinia, near the Tibulati and immediately north of the Coracenses.
Cumanenses (Cumanesi)
Lestricones/Lestrigones (Lestriconi/Lestrigoni)
Licinini
Longonenses (Longonensi)
Macrini
Opini
Subasani
Sumbri
Tarabeni
Tibulati, they dwelt at the far north of Sardinia, about the ancient city of Tibula, near the Corsi (for whom Corsica is named) and immediately north of the Coracenses.
Titiani
Venacini
Rutuli (in Ardea territory, Latium ancient coastal city)

See also
Ligures
Corsi
List of ancient Corsican and Sardinian tribes
Ancient peoples of Italy
Alpine race
Torrean civilization

References

Bibliography
ARSLAN E. A. 2004b, LVI.14 Garlasco, in I Liguri. Un antico popolo europeo tra Alpi e Mediterraneo, Catalogo della Mostra (Genova, 23.10.2004–23.1.2005), Milano-Ginevra, pp. 429–431.
ARSLAN E. A. 2004 c.s., Liguri e Galli in Lomellina, in I Liguri. Un antico popolo europeo tra Alpi e Mediterraneo, Saggi Mostra (Genova, 23.10.2004–23.1.2005).
Raffaele De Marinis, Giuseppina Spadea (a cura di), Ancora sui Liguri. Un antico popolo europeo tra Alpi e Mediterraneo, De Ferrari editore, Genova 2007 (scheda sul volume).
John Patterson, Sanniti,Liguri e Romani,Comune di Circello;Benevento
Giuseppina Spadea (a cura di), I Liguri. Un antico popolo europeo tra Alpi e Mediterraneo" (catalogo mostra, Genova 2004–2005), Skira editore, Genova 2004

External links
 - Source texts of ancient Greek and Roman authors

 - Strabo's work The Geography'' (Geographica). Book 4, Chapter 6, is about Liguria (that the author includes in Cisalpine Gaul).

 
Ligurian
ancient Ligurian tribes